Hylophilus is a genus of bird in the family Vireonidae.

Species
Established by Coenraad Jacob Temminck in 1822, it contains the following species :

The name Hylophilus is composed of the Greek words for "forest" or "woodland" (hulē) and "-loving" (philos, from phileō, meaning "to love").

References

External links
 
 
 

 
Bird genera
Taxonomy articles created by Polbot
Taxa named by Coenraad Jacob Temminck